Bregje de Brouwer (born 9 March 1999) is a Dutch synchronized swimmer. She competed in the 2020 Summer Olympics held in Tokyo, Japan. Her twin sister Noortje is her usual partner in pairs events.

References

1999 births
Living people
Synchronized swimmers at the 2020 Summer Olympics
Dutch synchronized swimmers
Olympic synchronized swimmers of the Netherlands
Artistic swimmers at the 2022 World Aquatics Championships
Dutch twins
Twin sportspeople